In the 1976–77 season, MC Alger is competing in the National 1 for the 12th season, as well as the Algerian Cup. It is their 9th consecutive season in the top flight of Algerian football. They will be competing in National, the Algerian Cup and the African Cup of Champions.

Squad list
Players and squad numbers last updated on 18 November 1976.Note: Flags indicate national team as has been defined under FIFA eligibility rules. Players may hold more than one non-FIFA nationality.

Pre-season and friendlies

Competitions

Overview

Championnat National

League table

Results by round

Matches

Algerian Cup

African Cup of Champions Clubs

Squad information

Appearances and goals

Goalscorers
Includes all competitive matches. The list is sorted alphabetically by surname when total goals are equal.

Notes

References

External links
 1976–77 MC Alger season at sebbar.kazeo.com 

MC Alger seasons